

146001–146100 

|-id=040
| 146040 Alicebowman ||  || Alice Bowman (born 1960) is a group supervisor at the Johns Hopkins University Applied Physics Laboratory. She served as the Mission Operations Manager for the New Horizons Mission to Pluto. || 
|}

146101–146200 

|-bgcolor=#f2f2f2
| colspan=4 align=center | 
|}

146201–146300 

|-id=268
| 146268 Jennipolakis || 2001 DQ || Jennifer Polakis (born 1959), American amateur astronomer, eclipse chaser and popularizer of astronomy || 
|}

146301–146400 

|-bgcolor=#f2f2f2
| colspan=4 align=center | 
|}

146401–146500 

|-id=442
| 146442 Dwaynebrown ||  || Dwayne C. Brown (born 1960), the Public Affairs Officer for the New Horizons mission to Pluto || 
|}

146501–146600 

|-bgcolor=#f2f2f2
| colspan=4 align=center | 
|}

146601–146700 

|-bgcolor=#f2f2f2
| colspan=4 align=center | 
|}

146701–146800 

|-bgcolor=#f2f2f2
| colspan=4 align=center | 
|}

146801–146900 

|-bgcolor=#f2f2f2
| colspan=4 align=center | 
|}

146901–147000 

|-id=921
| 146921 Michaelbuckley ||  || Michael R. Buckley (born 1969) is a senior public affairs specialist at the Johns Hopkins University Applied Physics Laboratory. He served as the Public Affairs Officer for the New Horizons mission to Pluto. || 
|}

References 

146001-147000